Donald Foster may refer to:
 Donald Foster (actor) (1889–1969), American film and television actor
 Don Foster, Baron Foster of Bath (born 1947), British Liberal Democrat politician
 Donald Wayne Foster (born 1950), American Shakespeare scholar
 Don Foster (screenwriter), known for the American television sitcom Dharma & Greg (19972002)